Higienópolis-Mackenzie is a station on Line 4-Yellow of the São Paulo Metro, operated by ViaQuatro. It was opened on 23 January 2018. The station will have a connection with future Line 6-Orange. The construction of the Line 6 station began in April 2015.

History
The station was predicted to open until the end of the second semester of 2017. But, on 27 December 2017, the State Government of São Paulo delayed the opening to January 2018, because the Secretariat of Metropolitan Transports reported that there were glasses that needed to be installed, which caused a fine to the responsible consortium by the construction in R$ 17 million (US$ ) because of the delay. Therefore, the station would be delivered with the delay of almost four years, as in the first predictions it was scheduled to open in mid-2014. On 19 January 2018, it was announced the official opening date: 23 January 2018. On the Line 6-Orange, the predicted opening date is end of 2021.

Station layout

See also
 Vai-Vai

References

São Paulo Metro stations
Railway stations located underground in Brazil
Railway stations opened in 2018
2018 establishments in Brazil
Railway stations scheduled to open in 2026